Komm, süßer Tod (Come Sweet Death) is a 2000 Austrian darkly humorous crime film based on the novel by Wolf Haas of the same name. It is one of the Brenner detective stories, which tell of the luckless life of ex-policeman and unsuccessful private investigator Simon Brenner, who tramps throughout Austria and stumbles upon difficult crime cases. Brenner is portrayed by one of Austria's most famous comedians, Josef Hader. The film won the Romy Award for being the most successful Austrian movie of 2001.

Plot
Former police officer and luckless private investigator Simon Brenner has become an emergency medical technician, having been fired from the police force because he slept with his boss's wife. He only wants to keep out of trouble and keep a steady job for a while, but finds himself caught up in a war between two rival EMS organizations.

Brenner is dragged back into his old detective life when a well-known nurse falls victim to a double murder in a hospital. The weary Brenner does not care, but his young and idealistic EMS partner Berti is eager to investigate. Soon after this another murder occurs — this time a fellow paramedic is the victim.

Brenner finally realizes that he has to solve this case, if only to return to his quiet and blissfully uneventful life of late. Slowly but stubbornly plodding along, he uncovers the ugly truth as he is confronted with the bitter war between rival ambulance companies.

Cast 
Josef Hader as Simon Brenner
Simon Schwarz as Berti
Barbara Rudnik as Klara
Michael Schönborn as Junior
Bernd Michael Lade as Gross, "Piefke"
Nina Proll as Angelika Lanz
Karl Markovics as Jäger
Reinhard Nowak as Hansi Munz

Production
Komm, süßer Tod was produced by DOR Film, the Austrian Film Institute and ORF.

Reception
The film opened on 50 screens, large for Austria. It became the fourth-highest-grossing film in Austria of all time with admissions of 232,009.

References

External links 
 
 

2000 films
2000 black comedy films
2000s crime comedy films
2000s German-language films
Films based on Austrian novels
Films based on crime novels
2000 comedy films
Austrian black comedy films
Austrian crime comedy films